Toria was a trimaran sailboat designed by Derek Kelsall and launched in 1966. It was named after Kelsall's daughter.

Achievements 
In 1966 Toria won the first RWYC Two-Handed Round Britain Race. It also won fifth place in the solo Atlantic race.

Destruction 
In 1976 Toria caught fire during the solo Atlantic race.

Legacy 
Toria was the first design by Kelsall, the first foam sandwich constructed trimaran in the world, and is directly credited with igniting French interest in multihull sailing.

Toria led directly to the design of Trifle.

See also 
 List of multihulls
 Trifle
 Derek Kelsall

References 

Trimarans
1960s sailing yachts